UMS Minye Theinkhathu (71) (Burmese: မင်းရဲသိင်္ခသူ) is a Sindhughosh (Kilo)-class submarine owned by the Myanmar Navy. It is the service's first and, only serving submarine. Before being acquired by Myanmar, it served in the Indian Navy as INS Sindhuvir (S58) (Brave at the Sea).

Background 

Beginning in the 1980s and ending in 2000, the Indian Navy acquired ten Kilo-class submarines from the Soviet Union and its successor state Russia. Within India, they are known as the Sindhughosh class.

Myanmar Navy service 
Myanmar acquired Sindhuvir in 2020. The ship was refitted by Hindustan Shipyard before the handover.

The submarine was first seen publicly as a Myanmar Navy ship, as UMS Minye Theinkhathu, on 15 October 2020 as part of a naval fleet exercise (‘Bandoola 2020’). The submarine was formally commissioned along with other six new ships at the 73rd Navy Day ceremony on 24 December 2020. The ceremony was attended by the Indian and Russian ambassadors to Myanmar, which the military intelligence company Jane's believes could indicate Russian involvement in the submarine's transfer to Myanmar.

It appears to be named after Minye Theinkhathu of Toungoo (Taungoo), who was the father of King Bayinnaung and served as viceroy of Toungoo from 1540 to 1549.

Gallery

References

 

Sindhughosh-class submarines
Attack submarines
Ships built in the Soviet Union
1987 ships
Submarines of the Myanmar Navy